Md Jahangir Al Mustahidur Rahman is a Bangladesh Army Major General. In his long illustrative career he was also the chairman of Bangladesh Tea Board. He is currently appointed as the Ambassador of Bangladesh to Lebanon.

Early life
Rahman was born on 5 July 1967 in Tangail District, East Pakistan, Pakistan. He joined Bangladesh Military Academy and was commission into the Bangladesh Army Service Corps on 25 December 1986. 

Rahman completed his undergraduate and graduate degrees from the National University of Bangladesh. He graduated from the Defence Services Command and Staff College and received command training in Pakistan.

Career
Rahman received his commission on 25 December 1986.

Rahman served as the commander of a Supply and Transport Battalion. He was the commanding officer of a Station Supply Depot. He worked as an Assistant Military Secretary in the Bangladesh Army headquarters. 

Rahman held a number of positions in the military intelligence agency, Directorate General of Forces Intelligence. He worked as an instructor in the Bangladesh Military Academy and Army Service Corps School. He was deployed in United Nations Iraq–Kuwait Observation Mission in 1991. 

Rahman was promoted to commandant of the Army Service Corps Centre and School. He was then transferred to the Army headquarters where he worked as the director of Supply and Transport Directorate. 

Rahman served as the Managing Director of the Bangladesh Army owned Bangladesh Machine Tools Factory. He served as the Deputy Chief Supply Officer of the United Nations Mission in Sudan. He served in the United Nations Mission in Liberia as its Deputy Chief of Integrated Support Services.

Rahman was appointed Chairman of Bangladesh Tea Board in 2018. He inaugurated the Sreemangal Upazila tea auction center. In September 2019, he was recalled back to the army. He was appointed ambassador of Bangladesh to Lebanon in July 2020.

References

Living people
Bangladesh Army generals
1967 births
Ambassadors of Bangladesh to Lebanon
People from Tangail District